The 2007 North America 4 was the second North America 4 rugby tournament. Each of the four teams played each other five times in round-robin play.

Round-Robin Standings

External links
Official website

2007
2007 rugby union tournaments for clubs
2007 in Canadian rugby union
2007 in American rugby union
2007 in North American rugby union